The 1843 Constitution of Haiti was enacted on December 30, 1843, during the administration of Charles Rivière-Hérard.

The constitution contained many important innovations. The judges were to be elected by the people, instead of being appointed by the President; all offenses, either criminal, political, or by the press, were to be submitted to trials by jury. Presidency for life was abolished; the term of the Chief of the Executive Power was limited to four years; and no measure could be adopted by the President without the countersign of the proper Minister. The right to introduce laws was conferred on the House of Representatives and on the Senate as well as on the President. Matters concerning the communes and the arrondissements were in charge of the municipalities and the arrondissement councils. An estimate of the revenues and expenses was to be voted annually; a Court of Accounts was instituted. The Army was declared a law-abiding body; and strict measures were enacted in view of guaranteeing personal freedom and respect of property.

References

Politics of Haiti
Haiti
1843 in Haiti
1843 documents